Antonio García (17 January 1909 – 15 July 1993) was a Mexican sports shooter. He competed in the 50 m rifle event at the 1936 Summer Olympics.

References

External links
 

1909 births
1993 deaths
Mexican male sport shooters
Olympic shooters of Mexico
Shooters at the 1936 Summer Olympics
Sportspeople from Mexico City